Feeney is a surname. Notable people with the surname include:

 Adam Feeney, Australian tennis player
 Adam King Feeney, Canadian record producer and disc jockey known professionally as Frank Dukes
 Angela Feeney, Northern Irish singer
 Anne Feeney, American musician
 Blair Feeney, New Zealand rugby union player
 Carol Feeney, American rower
 Chub Feeney, baseball administrator
 Charles F. "Chuck" Feeney, billionaire businessman
 Dan Feeney, American football player
 David Feeney, Australian politician
 Denis Feeney, Princeton academic
 F. X. Feeney, American writer and filmmaker
 Geraldine Feeney, Irish politician
Helen M. Feeney, American nun
 Hugh Feeney, Irish bomber
 Jamie Feeney, Australian rugby league player
 Jim Feeney, Northern Irish footballer
 Joe Feeney, singer
 Joel Feeney, Canadian singer
 John Feeney (disambiguation)
 Julie Feeney, Irish musician
 Kevin Feeney (1952–2013), Irish judge
 Lee Feeney, Northern Irish footballer
 Leonard Feeney, Jesuit priest, founder of Feeneyism
 Lexie Feeney, Australian archer
 Liam Feeney (born 1987), English footballer
 Mark Feeney, Pulitzer prize winner
 Michael Feeney (schoolteacher), associate of Nora Barnacle
 Michael Feeney (MBE), founder of the Mayo Peace Park
 Michael Feeney, the defendant in the case R. v. Feeney
 Nell Feeney, Australian actress
 Thomas John Feeney, American Roman Catholic bishop
 Tom Feeney, Floridian politician
 Tom Feeney, Irish hurler
 Travis Feeney, American football player
 Vinny Feeney, Irish boxer
 Warren Feeney, Northern Irish footballer

See also
 Mel B. Feany, American neuropathologist